The discography American rapper and singer Coi Leray consists of one studio album, two mixtapes, one extended play, and 47 singles (including 23 as a featured artist).

Studio albums

Mixtapes

Extended plays

Singles

As lead artist

As featured artist

Other charted songs

Guest appearances

Notes

References

Hip hop discographies